Claudio Casacci (born 1958) is an Italian space scientist and amateur astronomer, who is credited by the Minor Planet Center with the discovery of several main-belt asteroids between 1995 and 1998. He works at Thales Alenia Space in Turin, Italy.

In 1995, the outer main-belt asteroid 4814 Casacci was named in his honour.

List of discovered minor planets 

All co-discoveries were made with:  M. Tombelli

See also

References 
 

1958 births
Discoverers of asteroids

21st-century Italian astronomers
Living people
20th-century Italian astronomers